West Aarani block is a revenue block in the Tiruvannamalai district of Tamil Nadu, India. It has a total of 37 panchayat villages.

References 
 

Revenue blocks in Tiruvannamalai district